Gwilliam or Gwilym or Gwilliams may refer to:

 Gwilliam (surname)
Brad Gwilliam (born 1966), Australian rules footballer
Dianna Gwilliams (born 1957), educator
Edward Gwilliam, English footballer
George Gwilliam, English Aramaicist
John Gwilliam (1923–2016), Welsh rugby union player and schoolteacher
 Gwilliam (given name)
Gwilym Iwan Jones (1904–1995), Welsh photographer and anthropologist
 Gwilliam v West Hertfordshire Hospital NHS, English tort law case concerning occupiers' liability